KQMC (90.1 FM) is a radio station licensed to serve Hawthorne, Nevada. The station is owned by Lucky Boy Educational Media, Inc. It airs a classic hits format.

The station was assigned the KQMC call letters by the Federal Communications Commission on February 5, 2003.

References

External links

QMC
Classic hits radio stations in the United States
Hawthorne, Nevada
Radio stations established in 2005
2005 establishments in Nevada